The Huawei Ascend P2 is a smartphone manufactured by Huawei. It was released in 2013. It is claimed to be the world's fastest smartphone. China's Huawei claimed that this device is the fastest (with full 4G support) in its own niche. According to the company it would use LTE category 4 to achieve network speeds up to 150Mbit/s. It comes with a 4.7-inch high-definition screen with a powerful 1.5 GHz quad-core processor. It is sharp-cornered and its body is thinner than a pencil at 8.4 mm. Huawei announced that the Ascend P2 Android smartphone would launch in UK in June, 2013. It is available worldwide during July–September, i.e. the third quarter of 2013.

It is similar to the Huawei STREAM X GL07S.

Software
The Ascend P2 ships with Android 4.1 with Huawei's Emotion UI version 1.6.

References

Android (operating system) devices
Mobile phones introduced in 2013
Discontinued smartphones
P2